Banaj is a village in Berat County, central Albania. At the 2015 local government reform it became part of the municipality Dimal.

References

Populated places in Dimal, Albania
Villages in Berat County